WKKP (“Classic Country 100.9 FM and 1410 AM”) broadcasts on 1410 kHz at a power of 2,500 watts daytime and 58 watts at night from a tower located on Racetrack Road in McDonough, Georgia, a southern suburb of Atlanta. The station is owned by Henry County Radio Co, Inc. and originates from studios located on Brownlee Road in Jackson, Georgia. The FM translator broadcasts at a frequency of 100.9 MHz with a power of 250 watts from the tower located on Racetrack Rd.

History
The station callsign was originally WJGA and was assigned to a frequency of 1540 kHz and located in Jackson, Georgia. The station was sold and moved to McDonough, the calls changed to WZAL, assigned to 1540 kHz, and owned by Dallas Tarkenton (older brother of Fran Tarkenton). Broadcasting as WZAL continued until it was purchased by DeVan-Moore Communication, Inc. in 1980. The station saw successful growth in the hands of Jim DeVan, former manager of WMCD (Statesboro, Georgia), and moved to 1410 kHz in the late 1980s.

Jim DeVan managed WZAL until his sudden death from a work-related accident in 1991. The station was sold to a former Tarkenton associate (Earnhart), who changed the call letters and moved the studios to Jackson several years later, but left the transmitter in McDonough. WKKP (Kopy Kat Programming) aired local programming in the morning, followed by simulcast programming from sister station WJGA-FM in Jackson, Georgia.

The station has gone through many format changes, and currently broadcasts Classic Country programming from satellite. WKKP also broadcasts AP network news at the top of the hour. The Henry County Schools high school football game of the week is also aired Friday night and they also broadcast high school baseball and basketball games in season, with Rob Gulley providing play by play.

External links
WKKP Facebook

KKP
Classic country radio stations in the United States
Radio stations established in 1979
1979 establishments in Georgia (U.S. state)